William Laurence Roberts (9 May 1897 – 7 September 1960) was an Australian rules footballer who played with South Melbourne in the Victorian Football League (VFL).

Roberts played a single game for South Melbourne in Round 2 of the 1923 season against Fitzroy. During the game, one of the Fitzroy players recognised him as a man who, under the name “Williams” had been at Fitzroy two or three seasons previously. Investigations revealed he had been granted a permit to move from North Adelaide to Fitzroy using the name “W. Reidy”. Roberts claimed he had no knowledge of this 1921 permit but the League refused his request for a permit to move to Port Melbourne and his senior football career ended.

In early 1922, Roberts was arrested for stealing a £10 note, and subsequently sentenced to 12 months hard labour in Goulburn gaol.

Notes

External links 

1897 births
1960 deaths
Australian rules footballers from Victoria (Australia)
Sydney Swans players